Arano may refer to:

 , a ghost town in central Argentina
 Arano, Navarre, a village in northern Spain

People with the surname
 Carlos Arano (born 1980), Argentinian football player, also known as Chiche Arano
 Cristián Arano (born 1995), Bolivian football player
 Francisco Arano Montero (born 1950), Mexican politician
 Francisco Lara Arano (born 1959), Mexican politician
 Paul Arano Ruiz (born 1995), Bolivian football player
 Ramón Arano (1939–2012), Mexican baseball player
 Takuma Arano (born 1993), Japanese football player
 Víctor Arano (born 1995), Mexican baseball player

See also
 Aranos, a town in the Hardap Region of Namibia